José Amedo (21 June 1918 – 30 May 2010) was a Spanish sports shooter. He competed in the 50 metre pistol event at the 1968 Summer Olympics.

References

1918 births
2010 deaths
Spanish male sport shooters
Olympic shooters of Spain
Shooters at the 1968 Summer Olympics
People from Ordes (comarca)
Sportspeople from the Province of A Coruña
20th-century Spanish people